Wenshan Zhuang and Miao Autonomous Prefecture is an autonomous prefecture in southeastern Yunnan Province, People's Republic of China, and is the easternmost prefecture-level division of the province.

Subdivisions

Ethnic groups
Wenshan is highly diverse. According to a local saying, "Han and Hui live by the market, Zhuang and Dai live by the water, Miao and Yi live on the mountains, and Yao live among the bamboos."

Some of Wenshan's ethnic groups include:

Han Chinese
Tai peoples
Zhuang (3 branches according to Kaup (2000); 4 branches according to Johnson (2011))
Nong
Sha  ("Yei Zhuang")
Tu  ("Dai Zhuang")
Min
Dai
Tai Hongjin - Maguan County
Kra peoples
Buyang - Funing County, Guangnan County
Lachi - Maguan County
Gelao - Malipo County
Qabiao - Malipo County
Miao–Yao peoples
Miao people (listed from east to west)
Lopsided Miao ( Shuat)
White Miao ( Dleub)
Green Miao ( Shib, Nzhuab)
Flowery Miao ( Soud, Bes, Buak)
Yao people
Tibeto-Burman peoples
Yi people - Funing County, Guangnan County, Malipo County
Bai people - Qiubei County (in Mazhelong , etc.), Yanshan County (in Jiayi ), Guangnan County (in Zhulin )
Mon-Khmer peoples
Bolyu - Guangnan County
Bugan - Guangnan County, Xichou County

Yunnan (1979) lists Jiazhou  (pop. 475), Longjiang  (pop. 54), Tusi  (pop. 134), and Bendi  (pop. 7) as Zhuang subgroups of unknown linguistic affiliation.

Yi
The Wenshan Prefecture Gazetteer (2000) and the Wenshan Prefecture Ethnic Gazetteer (2005) list the following Yi ethnic subdivisions in Wenshan Prefecture.

Luo
White Lolo (autonyms: Suodu , Luoluobu , Xiqima , Gaisipo )
Mokong (Gaokujiao Luo ) of Funing and Guangnan counties
Mudai of Funing and Napo counties
Black Lolo (autonyms: Nuosupo , Luoluopo ): in Qiubei, Yanshan, and Wenshan counties
Flowery Lolo (autonyms: Hanluowu , Luwu , Niesu ): in Funing, Guangnan, Malipo, Xichou, Maguan, and Yanshan counties
Pu
Black Phula (autonym: Azha )
White Phula (autonym: Zuoke )
Flowery Phula (autonym: Abo )
Sani (autonym: Sanipo ): in Qiubei County
Awu (autonym: Awu ; exonyms: Mengwu , Awu , Mengwu , Mengzu )
Lai (autonym; a branch of the Awu , also called Mengwu ): in Xisa , Xichou; Daping  and Nanwenhe  of Malipo
Gepu (autonyms: Gepo , Alingpo ; exonyms: Geluoluo/duo , Adu , Aga ): in Tiechang  and Donggan  townships of Malipo County
Axi: in Wenshan, Yanshan, and Qiubei counties
Lalu (Lalupu ; exonym: Xiangtang ): in Nanping

Yao
The Wenshan Prefecture Gazetteer (2000) lists the following Yao ethnic subdivisions in Wenshan Prefecture.

Men or Jinmen (exonym: Landian Yao )
Mengmian or Youmian (exonyms: Daban Yao , Jiao Yao )
Xiu or Ya (exonyms: Shan Yao , Guoshan Yao ): in Longmen and Longshao of Funing County, and in Tiechang, Jinchang, and other locations of Malipo County

Gelao
The Wenshan Prefecture Gazetteer  (2000) lists the following Gelao ethnic subdivisions in Wenshan Prefecture. The Gelao of Wenshan are also locally known as the Laobazi  or Bazi .

White Gelao
Green Gelao
Red Gelao
Flowery Gelao (also known as the Wai Gelao or Pipao Gelao)

History

The prefecture has been inhabited for at least 4000 years, as evidenced by surviving neolithic rock art in Malipo County. The seat of Guangnan, known today as Liancheng, was the heart of the Gouding Kingdom that lasted approximately 400 years, from 111 BC to 316 AD.

Transportation
Wenshan Airport

References

External links

Wenshan Prefecture Official Site

 
Zhuang autonomous prefectures
Miao autonomous prefectures